Shakira is a Colombian singer and songwriter. She began her career in 1990 with Sony Music and has been one of the most popular Latin act in the world since the mid-1990s. Shakira has sold over 85 million records worldwide. She has won 390 awards from 875 nominations including 3 Grammy Awards and 12 Latin Grammy Awards, making her the most awarded Latin artist of all time.

In 2002, Shakira won "Best Music Video for "Suerte" at the Latin Grammy Awards. In 2003, Shakira won four awards from eleven nominations, including Echo Award for Best International Female Artist and World Music Awards for Best Selling Latin Female Artist. In 2005, Shakira won sixteen awards from twenty two nominations, including American Music Awards for Best Latin Artist, Best Female at 2005 MTV Europe Music Awards and three Billboard Music Awards.

In 2006, Shakira won thirty two awards from fifty nominations, including Grammy Awards for Best Latin Rock/Alternative Album, American Music Awards for Favorite Latin Artist, six Latin Billboard Music Awards for "La Tortura" for Latin Ringtone of the Year, Latin Pop Airplay Song of the Year - Duo or Group, Hot Latin Song of the Year, Hot Latin Song of the Year-Vocal Duet or Collaboration, Spirit of the Hope and Latin Pop Album-Female, four Latin Grammy Awards for Record of the Year and Song of the Year for "La Tortura", Album of the Year and Best Pop Vocal Album, Female  for Fijación Oral Vol. 1.

Shakira released her sixth studio album She Wolf, in October 2009, featuring the first single "She Wolf". In 2009, Shakira won Best International Pop Artist of the Year at 51st Bambi Awards. In 2010, Shakira has won two Billboard Music Awards from five nominations and six Billboard Latin Music Awards from thirteen nominations and World best Selling Latin American artist of the year at 2010 World Music Awards.

In 2020 she received her first Emmy Award nomination, becoming the first South-American act in history to be nominated at the Grammy Awards, Latin Grammys, Golden Globes and Emmy Awards. In 2023 she became the female artist with the most Guinness World Record wins in history, surpassing Madonna.

Awards and nominations

ALMA Awards
The American Latino Media Arts Award, or ALMA Awards is a distinction awarded to Latino performers who promote positive portrayals of Latinos in the entertainment field. Shakira has received five awards from seven nominations.

|-
| rowspan="3" style="text-align:center"|2002
| Shakira
| Outstanding Female Performer, Female
|
|-
| Laundry Service
| Album of the Year
|
|-
| "Whenever, Wherever"
| Song of the Year
|
|-
| rowspan="2" style="text-align:center"|2006
| Shakira
| Outstanding Female Performer, Female
|
|-
| Fijacion Oral Vol. 1
| Album of the Year
|
|-
| style="text-align:center"|2008
| Shakira
| Humanitarian Award
|
|-
| style="text-align:center"|2011
| Shakira
| Best Female Artist In Music
|
|-
|}

Canadian Independent Music Awards

|-
| rowspan="1" style="text-align:center"|2003
| Whenever, Wherever
| Best International Video
|

Amadeus Austrian Music Awards

|-
| rowspan="1" style="text-align:center"|2003
| Whenever, Wherever
| International Single of the Year
| 
|-
| rowspan="1" style="text-align:center"|2007
| Hips Don't Lie
| International Single of the Year
|

American Music Awards
The American Music Awards is an annual awards ceremony created by Dick Clark in 1973. Shakira has received 5 awards from 8 nominations.

|-
| style="text-align:center"|2001
| rowspan="8" style="text-align:center"| Shakira
| Favorite Latin Artist
|
|-
| style="text-align:center"|2002
| Favorite Latin Artist
|
|-
|-
| style="text-align:center"|2003
| Favorite Latin Artist
|
|-
| style="text-align:center"|2005
| Favorite Latin Artist
|
|-
| style="text-align:center"|2006
| Favorite Latin Artist
|
|-
| style="text-align:center"|2010
| Favorite Latin Artist
|
|-
| rowspan="1" style="text-align:center"|2012
| Favorite Latin Artist
|
|-
| rowspan="1" style="text-align:center"|2017
| Favorite Latin Artist
|
|-

ASCAP Awards

ASCAP Latin Awards

|-
| style="text-align:center"|2007
| Hips Don't Lie
| rowspan="5" |Pop/Ballad
| 
|-
| style="text-align:center"|2010
| Loba
| 
|-
| rowspan="3" style="text-align:center"|2011
| Did It Again
| 
|-
| Gitana
| 
|-
| Waka Waka (This Time For Africa)
| 
|-
| style="text-align:center"|2012
| Rabiosa
| rowspan="2" style="text-align:center"|Pop
| 
|-
| style="text-align:center"|2013
| Addicted To You
| 
|-
| style="text-align:center"|2017
| La Bicicleta
| style="text-align:center"|Tropical
| 
|-
| rowspan="2" style="text-align:center"|2018
| Chantaje
| style="text-align:center"|Pop
| 
|-
| Deja Vu
| style="text-align:center"|Tropical
| 
|-
| style="text-align:center"|2019
| Clandestino
| style="text-align:center"|Winning song
| 
|-
| rowspan="2" style="text-align:center"|2021
| Tutu Remix
| style="text-align:center"|Winning Song
| 
|-
| Me Gusta
| style="text-align:center"|Winning song
| 
|-
|}

ASCAP Pop Awards

|-
| style="text-align:center"|2007
| Hips Don't Lie
| Most Performed Song
| 
|-
|}

Bambi Awards
Bambi Awards are the German equivalent of the Emmy awards, honoring achievement in film, television, music and sports, among other fields. Shakira has received one award from two nominations.

|-
| style="text-align:center"|2009
| Shakira
| International Pop Artist
|
|-
| style="text-align:center"|2010
| Shakira
| International Pop Artist
|
|-

Barranquilla’s Carnival

|-
| style="text-align:center"|1998
| Shakira
| Super Congo de Oro
| 
|-
|}

BET Awards
The BET Awards were established in 2001 by the Black Entertainment Television network to celebrate African Americans and other minorities in music, acting, sports, and other fields of entertainment. Shakira has been nominated for 1 award for her collaboration with American-African singer Beyonce.

|-
| style="text-align:center"|2007
| Beautiful Liar (with Beyonce)
| Video of the Year
|
|-

Billboard Latin Music Awards 
The Billboard Latin Music Awards grew out of the Billboard Music Awards program from Billboard Magazine, an industry publication charting the sales and radio airplay success of musical recordings. Shakira has received 41 awards from 101 nominations.

|-
| rowspan="3" style="text-align:center"|1997
| Pies Descalzos
| Best Pop Album 
|
|-
| Un Poco de Amor
| Best Video of the Year
|
|-
| Shakira
| Best New Artist
|
|-
|1999
|Dónde Están los Ladrones?
|Pop Album of the Year, Female
|
|-
| rowspan="3" style="text-align:center"|2001
| rowspan="2" |MTV Unplugged
| Latin Rock Album of the Year
|
|-
| Pop Album of the Year, Female 
|
|-
|Shakira
| Billboard 50 Artist of the Year
|
|-
| rowspan="2" style="text-align:center"|2002
| Suerte
| Latin Pop Airplay Track of the Year
|
|-
|rowspan="2"|Shakira
|Viewer’s Choice Award
|
|-
| rowspan="2" style="text-align:center"|2003
| Latin Tour of the Year
|
|-
|Grandes Éxitos
|Latin Greatest Hits Album Of The Year
|
|-
| style="text-align:center"|2004
| Que Me Quedes Tú
| Latin Pop Airplay Track of the Year, Female
|
|-
| rowspan="9" style="text-align:center"|2006
| rowspan="4" |La Tortura (with Alejandro Sanz)
| Hot Latin Song of the Year
|
|-
| Hot Latin Song of the Year, Vocal Duet
|
|-
| Latin Pop Airplay Song Of The Year, Duo or Group
|
|-
| Latin Ringtone of the Year
|
|-
| rowspan="3" |Shakira
| Hot Latin Songs Artist of the Year
|
|-
|Top Latin Albums Artist Of The Year
|
|-
| Spirit of Hope Award
|
|-
| rowspan="1" |No
| Latin Pop Airplay Song Of The Year, Female
|
|-
| rowspan="1" |Fijación Oral, Vol. 1
| Latin Pop Album Of The Year, Female
|
|-
| rowspan="4" style="text-align:center"|2007
| rowspan="3" |Hips Don't Lie (with Wyclef Jean)
| Hot Latin Song of the Year
|
|-
| Hot Latin Song Of The Year, Vocal Duet
|
|-
| Latin Pop Airplay Song Of The Year, Duo Or Group
|
|-
| rowspan="1" |Shakira
| Latin Tour of the Year
|
|-
| rowspan="2" style="text-align:center"|2008
| rowspan="1" |Te Lo Agradezco, Pero No (with Alejandro Sanz)
| Hot Latin Song Of The Year, Vocal Duet
|
|-
| rowspan="1"|Hips Don't Lie (with Wyclef Jean)
| Latin Ringtone of the Year
|
|-
| style="text-align:center"|2009
| rowspan="4"|Shakira
| Latin Digital Download Artist of the Year
|
|-
| rowspan="5" style="text-align:center"|2010
| Hot Latin Songs Artist of the Year, Female
|
|-
| Latin Pop Airplay Artist of the Year, Female
|
|-
| Tropical Airplay Artist of the Year, Female
|
|-
| rowspan="2" |Loba
| Latin Pop Airplay - Song of the year
|
|-
| Latin Digital Download - Song of the Year
|
|-
| rowspan="13" style="text-align:center"|2011
| rowspan="7"|Shakira
| Latin Artist of the Year
| 
|-
| 
Hot Latin Songs Artist of the Year, Female
| 
|-
| Top Latin Albums Artist of the Year, Female
| 
|-
| Latin Pop Airplay Artist of the Year, Solo
| 
|-
| Latin Pop Albums Artist of the Year, Solo
| 
|-
| Latin Touring Artist of the Year
| 
|-
| Latin Social Artist of the Year
| 
|-
| rowspan="2"|Loca
| Hot Latin Song of the Year, Vocal Event
| 
|-
| rowspan="2"|Latin Digital Download of the Year
| 
|-
| Waka Waka (This Time for Africa) (with Freshlyground)
| 
|-
| rowspan="3"|Sale el Sol
| Latin Album of the Year
| 
|-
| Latin Pop Album of the Year
| 
|-
| Latin Digital Album of the Year
| 
|-
| rowspan="10" style="text-align:center"|2012
| rowspan="7"|Shakira
| Artist of the Year 
| 
|-
| Songs Artist of the Year, Female 
| 
|-
| Albums Artist of the Year, Female 
| 
|-
| Latin Pop Albums Artist of the Year, Solo 
| 
|-
| Latin Pop Songs Artist of the Year, Solo 
| 
|-
| Tropical Songs Artist of the Year, Solo
| 
|-
| Social Artist of the Year
| 
|-
| rowspan="1"|Rabiosa
| rowspan="2"|Digital Song of the Year 
| 
|-
| rowspan="1"|Waka Waka (This Time for Africa) (with Freshlyground)
| 
|-
| rowspan="1"|Sale el Sol
| Digital Album of the Year 
| 
|-
| rowspan="7" style="text-align:center"|2013
| rowspan="6"|Shakira
| Social Artist of the Year
| 
|-
| Songs Artist of the Year, Female
| 
|-
| Streaming Artist of the Year
| 
|-
| Albums Artist of the Year, Female
| 
|-
| Latin Pop Songs Artist of the Year, Solo
| 
|-
| Latin Pop Albums Artist of the Year, Solo
| 
|-
| rowspan="1"|Addicted to You
| Latin Pop Song of the Year
| 
|-
| style="text-align:center"|2014
| rowspan="3"|Shakira
| rowspan="2"|Social Artist of the Year
| 
|-
| rowspan="2" style="text-align:center"|2015
|
|-
| Hot Latin Songs Artist of the Year, Female
|
|-
| rowspan="4" style="text-align:center"|2016
| rowspan="2" |Shakira
| Social Artist of the Year
|
|-
| Hot Latin Songs Artist of the Year, Female
|
|-
| rowspan="2"|Mi Verdad (with Maná)
| Latin Pop Song of the Year
|
|-
| Hot Latin Song of the Year, Vocal Event
|
|-
| rowspan="9"  style="text-align:center"| 2017
| rowspan="3"| Shakira
| Social Artist of the Year
| 
|-
|Hot Latin Songs Artist of the Year, Female
|
|-
|Latin Pop Songs Artist of the Year, Solo
|
|-
|Chantaje (with Maluma)
|rowspan="2"|Hot Latin Song of the Year, Vocal Event
|
|-
| rowspan="5"| La Bicicleta (with Carlos Vives)
|
|-
| Hot Latin Song of the Year
|
|-
| Airplay Song of the Year
|
|-
| Digital Song of the Year
|
|-
|Latin Pop Song of the Year
|
|-
| rowspan="12"  style="text-align:center"| 2018
| rowspan="4"| Shakira
| Social Artist of the Year
| 
|-
|Hot Latin Songs Artist of the Year, Female
|
|-
|Top Latin Album Artist of the Year, Female
|
|-
| Latin Pop Artist of the Year, Solo
|
|-
| rowspan="4"| Chantaje (with Maluma)
| Hot Latin Song of the Year, Vocal Event
|
|-
| Streaming Song of the Year
|
|-
| Digital Song of the Year
|
|-
|rowspan="2"|Latin Pop Song of the Year
|
|-
| rowspan="1"| Me Enamoré
|
|-
| rowspan="1"| Deja Vu (with Prince Royce)
| Tropical Song of the Year
|
|-
| rowspan="2"| El Dorado
| Top Latin Album of the Year
|
|-
| Latin Pop Album of the Year
|
|-
| rowspan="4" style="text-align:center"| 2019
| rowspan="3"| Shakira
| Latin Pop Artist of the Year, Solo
| 
|-
| Top Latin Albums Artist of the Year, Female
| 
|-
|Tour of the Year
|
|-
|Clandestino (with Maluma)
|Latin Pop Song of the Year
|
|-
| rowspan="2" style="text-align:center"| 2020
| rowspan="2"| Shakira
| Latin Pop Artist of the Year, Solo
| 
|-
| Top Latin Albums Artist of the Year, Female
| 
|-
|rowspan="3"| 2021
|rowspan="2"| Shakira
|Top Latin Albums Artist of the Year, Female
|
|-
|Latin Pop Artist of the Year, Solo
|
|-
|Me Gusta (with Anuel AA)
| Latin Pop Song of the Year
|
|-
|rowspan="1"| 2022
|Te Felicito (with Rauw Alejandro)
|Latin Pop Song of the Year
|
|-

Billboard Live Music Awards
The Billboard Live Music Awards is an annual meeting sponsored by Billboard magazine that honors the top international live entertainment industry artists and professionals. Shakira has been nominated once.

|-
| style="text-align:center"|2006
| Shakira
| Breakthrough Act
|
|-

Billboard Music Awards
The Billboard Music Awards are sponsored by Billboard magazine. The awards are based on sales data by Nielsen SoundScan and radio information by Nielsen Broadcast Data Systems. Shakira has received seven awards from twenty-three nominations.

|-
| rowspan="2" style="text-align:center"|2002
| rowspan="2" style="text-align:center"|Shakira
| Top Pop Artist - Female
|
|-
|Top Billboard 200 Album Artist - Female
|
|-
| rowspan="3" style="text-align:center"|2005
| Fijación Oral Vol. 1
| Latin Album of the Year
|
|-
| rowspan="2" |"La Tortura"
| Latin Song of the Year
|
|-
| Latin Album Artist of the Year
|
|-
| rowspan="4" style="text-align:center"|2006
| rowspan="3" |"Hips Don't Lie"
| Pop 100 Airplay Song of the Year
|
|-
| Top Pop 100 Airplay Track
|
|-
| Top Hot 100 Single
|
|-
| Shakira
| Top Billboard 200 Album Artist - Female
|
|-
| rowspan="8" style="text-align:center"|2011
| "Gypsy"
| Top Latin Song 
|
|-
| "Loca featuring El Cata"
| Top Latin Song 
|
|-
| rowspan="3" |Shakira
| Top Streaming Artist
|
|-
| Top Latin Artist
|
|-
| Fan Favorite Award
|
|-
| rowspan="2" |"Waka Waka (This Time for Africa)"
| Top Latin Song 
|
|-
| Top Streaming Song (Video)
|
|-
| rowspan="1" |Sale el Sol
| Top Latin Album
|
|-
| rowspan="2" style="text-align:center"|2012
| rowspan="2" |Shakira
| Top Latin Artist
|
|-
| Top Social Artist 
|
|-
| rowspan="1" style="text-align:center"|2013
| rowspan="1" |Shakira
| Top Latin Artist
|
|-
| rowspan="2" style="text-align:center"|2017
| "Chantaje" featuring Maluma
| rowspan="2" | Top Latin Song
|
|-
| "La Bicicleta" with Carlos Vives
| 
|-
| rowspan="1" style="text-align:center"|2018
| El Dorado
| rowspan="1" | Top Latin Album
|
|-

BMI Awards
Broadcast Music, Inc. (BMI) is one of three United States performing rights organizations, along with ASCAP and SESAC. It collects license fees on behalf of songwriters, composers, and music publishers and distributes them as royalties to those members whose works have been performed. Shakira has been received 33 awards from 33 nominations.

BMI Latin Awards

|-
| rowspan="4" style="text-align:center"|2000
| Shakira
| BMI Award - Songwriter of the Year
|
|-
| rowspan="1" |"Ciega, Sordomuda"
| rowspan="5" |Winning Songs
|
|-
| rowspan="1" |"Tú"
|
|-
| rowspan="1" |"Inevitable"
|
|-
| style="text-align:center"|2001
| "No Creo"
|
|-
| rowspan="1" style="text-align:center"|2002
| "Ojos Así"
|
|-
| rowspan="2" style="text-align:center"|2003
| "Suerte"
| Song of the Year
|
|-
| "Te Aviso, Te Anuncio (Tango)"
| rowspan="2"|Winning songs
|
|-
| style="text-align:center"|2004
| "Que Me Quedes Tú"
|
|-
| rowspan="4" style="text-align:center"|2007
| rowspan="3"|"La Tortura"
| Latin Ringtone of the Year
|
|-
| Song of the Year
|
|-
|  rowspan="17"| Winning Songs
|
|-
| "No"
|
|-
| rowspan="1" style="text-align:center"|2010
| rowspan="1"|"Las de la Intuición"
|
|-
| rowspan="2" style="text-align:center"|2011
| rowspan="1"|"Loba"
|
|-
| rowspan="1"|"Lo Hecho Está Hecho"
|
|-
| rowspan="2" style="text-align:center"|2012
| rowspan="1"|"Gitana"
|
|-
| rowspan="1"|"Waka Waka (This Time for Africa)"
|
|-
| rowspan="2" style="text-align:center"|2013
| rowspan="1"|"Rabiosa"
|
|-
| rowspan="1"|"Sale El Sol"
|
|-
| rowspan="1" style="text-align:center"|2014
| rowspan="1"|"Addicted To You"
|
|-
| rowspan="2" style="text-align:center"|2018
| rowspan="1"|"Chantaje"
|
|-
| rowspan="1"|"La Bicicleta"
|
|-
| rowspan="2" style="text-align:center"|2019
| rowspan="1"|"Me Enamoré"
|
|-
| rowspan="1"|"Perro Fiel"
|
|-
| rowspan="1" style="text-align:center"|2020
| rowspan="1"|"Clandestino"
|
|-

BMI London Awards

|-
| rowspan="2" style="text-align:center"|2008
| rowspan="2"|Beautiful Liar
| Pop Award
| 
|-
| Dance Award
| 
|-
|style="text-align:center"|2015
| rowspan="1"|Can't Remember to Forget You
| Winning songs
| 
|-
|}

BMI Pop Awards 

|-
| rowspan="2" style="text-align:center"|2003
| "Whenever, Wherever "
|  rowspan="3"|Winning Songs
|
|-
| "Underneath Your Clothes"
|
|-
|2007
| "Hips Don't Lie"
|
|-

BMI Urban Awards

|-
| style="text-align:center"|2006
| Hips Don't Lie
| Billboard No. 1s
| 
|-
|}

Bravo Otto Awards
The Bravo Otto is a German accolade honoring excellence of performers in film, television and music.

|-
| style="text-align:center"|2001
| Shakira
| Shootingstar solo
| 
|-
|}

BreakTudo Awards

|-
|rowspan="1"| 2022
|"Te Felicito" (with Rauw Alejandro)
|Latin Hit
|
|-

Brit Awards
The Brit Awards are the British Phonographic Industry's annual pop music awards. Shakira has been nominated twice.

|-
| style="text-align:center"|2003
| rowspan="2" |Shakira
| International Breakthrough Artist
|
|-
| style="text-align:center"|2010
| International Female Solo Artist
|

Buscando Artista Infantil

|-
| style="text-align:center"|1988
| Shakira
| Buscando Artista Infantil 1988
| 
|-
| style="text-align:center"|1989
| Shakira
| Buscando Artista Infantil 1989
| 
|-
| style="text-align:center"|1990
| Shakira
| Buscando Artista Infantil 1990
| 
|-
|}

Comet Awards

|-
| style="text-align:center"|2002
| Shakira
| Newcomer International
| 
|-
|}

Cyprus Music Awards

|-
| style="text-align:center"|2011
| rowspan="2" |Shakira
| rowspan="2"|Best Latin Artist
|
|-
| style="text-align:center"|2012
| 
|-
|}

Danish Music Awards

|-
| style="text-align:center"|2011
| Waka Waka (This Time for Africa)
| Foreign Hit Of The Year
|
|-

Dorian TV Awards

|-
| style="text-align:center"|2020
| Super Bowl LIV Halftime Show
| Best TV Musical Performance
|
|-

Do Something Awards

|-
| style="text-align:center"|2010
| rowspan="4"| Shakira
| rowspan="4"|Musical Artist
| 
|-
| style="text-align:center"|2011
| 
|-
| style="text-align:center"|2012
| 
|-
| style="text-align:center"|2013
| 
|-
|}

Echo Awards
Echo Awards is a German music award granted every year by the Deutsche Phono-Akademie (an association of recording companies). Each year's winner is determined by the previous year's sales. Shakira has received one award from nine nominations.

|-
| rowspan="3" style="text-align:center"|2003
| rowspan="2" |Shakira
| Best International Female Artist
|
|-
| Best International Newcomer
|
|-
| rowspan="1"|"Whenever, Wherever"
| Best International Single
|
|-
|rowspan="1" style="text-align:center"|2006
|rowspan="1"|Shakira
| Best International Female Artist
|
|-
| rowspan="2" style="text-align:center"|2007
| rowspan="1" |Shakira
| Best International Female Artist
|
|-
|rowspan="1"|"Hips Don't Lie"
| Best International Single
|
|-
| rowspan="2" style="text-align:center"|2011
| Shakira
| Best International Female Artist
|
|-
| "Waka Waka (This Time For Africa)"
| Hit Song of the Year
|
|-
| rowspan="1" style="text-align:center"|2015
| Shakira
| Best International Female Artist
|
|-

EVMA

|-
|rowspan="2"| 2011
|rowspan="2"| Rabiosa
|Mejor Colaboración
|
|-
|Mejor video Latino
|
|-
|}

Ein Herz für Kinder Awards

|-
| style="text-align:center"|2007
| Shakira
| Charity Award
| 
|-
|}

Emmy Awards

Primetime Emmy Awards
The Primetime Emmy Award is an American accolade bestowed by the Academy of Television Arts & Sciences in recognition of excellence in American primetime television programming, were first held in 1949 at the Hollywood Athletic Club. Shakira has received one nomination.

|-
| rowspan="1"|2020
| rowspan="1"|Super Bowl LIV Halftime Show Starring Jennifer Lopez and Shakira
| Outstanding Variety Special (Live)
| 
|-

ESPY Awards

|-
|rowspan="1"| 2011
|Waka Waka (This Time for Africa) (with Freshlyground)
|Best Song
|
|-

Globo Awards

|-
|1999
|Dónde Están los Ladrones?
|Best Feminine Pop Album
|
|-
|}

Goldene Europa

|-
| style="text-align:center"|2002
| Shakira
| Shootingstar des Jahres
| 
|-
|}

Golden Globe Awards
The Golden Globe Award is an accolade bestowed by the 93 members of the Hollywood Foreign Press Association (HFPA) recognizing excellence in film and television, both domestic and foreign. Shakira is the first Colombian to be nominated for a Golden Globe.

|-
| rowspan="1" style="text-align:center"|2007
| rowspan="1"|"Despedida"
| Best Original Song 
|
|-

Grammy Awards
The Grammy Awards are awarded annually by the National Academy of Recording Arts and Sciences in the United States. Shakira has received three awards from six nominations.

|-
| style="text-align:center"|1999
| Dónde Están Los Ladrones?
| Best Latin Rock/Alternative Performance
|
|-
| style="text-align:center"|2001
| MTV Unplugged
| Best Latin Pop Album
|
|-
| style="text-align:center"|2006
| Fijación Oral Vol. 1
|Best Latin Rock/Alternative Album
|
|-
| style="text-align:center"|2007
| "Hips Don't Lie" (with Wyclef Jean)
|rowspan="2"|Best Pop Collaboration with Vocals
|
|-
| style="text-align:center"|2008
| "Beautiful Liar" (with Beyoncé)
|
|-
| style="text-align:center"|2018
| El Dorado
| Best Latin Pop Album
|
|-

Groovevolt Music and Fashion Awards

|-
| rowspan="4" style="text-align:center"|2006
| rowspan="2"|Fijación Oral, Vol. 1
| Best Latin Album
| 
|-
| Best Female Pop Album
| 
|-
| La Tortura
| Best Female Pop Performance
| 
|-
| Shakira
| Most fashionable artist
| 
|-
|}

Grupo Hacette Awards

|-
| style="text-align:center"|2008
| SEAT Ibiza commercial
| rowspan="2"|Mejor Anuncio
| 
|-
| style="text-align:center"|2011
| SEAT commercial
| 
|-
|}

Guinness World Records

Harvard Foundation Artist of the Year
The Harvard Foundation, Harvard's center for intercultural arts and sciences initiatives, honors the world's most acclaimed artists, scientists, and leaders each year. Shakira has been named the artist of the year in 2011. “Her contributions to music and distinguished history of creativity have been applauded by people throughout the world, and she is greatly admired worldwide for her humanitarian efforts through her Barefoot Foundation.” said S. Allen Counter, director of the Harvard Foundation.

|-
| style="text-align:center"|2011
| Shakira
| Artist of the Year
|
|-

Heat Latin Music Awards
The Heat Latin Music Awards are awards created in 2015 by the chain of HTV music, to reward the best of Latin music.

|-
| style="text-align:center"|2015
| Shakira
| Best Female Artist
|
|-

Hungarian Music Awards
Hungarian Music Awards is the national music awards of Hungary, held every year since 1992 and promoted by Mahasz. Shakira has been nominated twice .

|-
| style="text-align:center"|2003|| Laundry Service||Fonogram Award for International Modern Pop/Rock Album || 
|-
| style="text-align:center"|2011|| Sale El Sol||Fonogram Award for International Modern Pop/Rock Album || 
|-

iHeartRadio Music Awards

|-
| style="text-align:center"|2016
| Mi Verdad (with Maná)
| Latin Song of the Year
|
|-
| rowspan="2" style="text-align:center"|2018
| Shakira
| Latin Artist of the Year
|
|-
| El Dorado
| Latin Album of the Year
|
|-
| style="text-align:center"|2019
| Clandestino
| Latin Song of the Year
|
|-
| style="text-align:center"|2023
| Don't You Worry (with Black Eyed Peas)
| Best Music Video
|
|-

International Dance Music Awards
The International Dance Music Awards were established in 1985. It is a part of the Winter Music Conference, a weeklong electronic music event held annually. Shakira has received two awards from nine nominations.

|-
| style="text-align:center"|2003
| "Objection"
| Best Latin Track
|
|-
| style="text-align:center"|2006
| "La tortura"
| Best Latin Track
|
|-
| style="text-align:center"|2007
| "Hips Don't Lie"
| Best Latin/Reggaeton Track
|
|-
| style="text-align:center"|2010
| "She Wolf"
| Best Latin/Reggaeton Track
|
|-
| rowspan="2" style="text-align:center"|2011
| "Loca"
| Best Latin/Reggaeton Track
|
|-
| "Waka Waka (This Time for Africa)"
| Best Latin/Reggaeton Track
|
|-
| rowspan="1" style="text-align:center"|2012
| " Rabiosa"
| Best Latin/Reggaeton Track
|
|-
| rowspan="1" style="text-align:center"|2013
| " Addicted to You"
| Best Latin/Reggaeton Track
|
|-
| rowspan="1" style="text-align:center"|2015
| " La La La (Brazil 2014)"
| Best Latin/Reggaeton Track
|
|-

International Reggae & World Music Awards 

|-
| style="text-align:center"|2006
| rowspan="3"|Shakira
| Best Latin Entertainer
| 
|-
| style="text-align:center"|2007
| Best Latin-oriented Entertainer
| 
|-
| style="text-align:center"|2010
| Best International Pop Artist
| 
|-
|}

Ivor Novello Awards
Shakira has won two awards in the Ivor Novello Awards. Her song Beautiful Liar won the category of "Best selling British song" in 2008. In 2022, she was honoured "Special International Award with Apple Music".

|-
| style="text-align:center"|2008
| Beautiful Liar
| Best-selling British song
| 
|-
| style="text-align:center"|2022
| Shakira
| Special International Award with Apple Music
| 
|}

Juno Awards
The Juno Awards are presented annually to Canadian musical artists and bands to acknowledge their artistic and technical achievements in all aspects of music. Shakira has received one nominations. 

|-
| style="text-align:center"|2003
| Laundry Service
| International Album of the Year
|
|-

Latin American Music Awards 
The Latin American Music Awards (Latin AMAs) is an annual American music award since 2015. It is the Spanish-language counterpart of the American Music Awards (AMAs). Shakira received 25 nominations.

|-
| rowspan="2" style="text-align:center"|2015
| rowspan="2" |Mi Verdad ft. Maná
| Favorite Collaboration
|
|-
| Favorite Song Pop/Rock
|
|-
| rowspan="1" style="text-align:center"|2016
| rowspan="1" |Shakira
| Favorite Female Artist Pop/Rock
|
|-
| rowspan="9" style="text-align:center"|2017
| rowspan="2" | Shakira
| Artist of the Year 
|
|-
| Favorite Female Artist Pop/Rock
|
|-
|rowspan="3" | Chantaje  ft. Maluma
|Favorite Song Pop/Rock
|
|-
|Favorite Collaboration
|
|-
|rowspan="2" |Song of the Year 
|
|-
|rowspan="2" |Deja Vu  ft. Prince Royce
|
|-
|Favorite Tropical Song
|
|-
|rowspan="2" | El Dorado
| Album of the Year
|
|-
| Favorite Album Pop/Rock
|
|-
| rowspan="4" style="text-align:center"|2018
| rowspan="3" |Shakira
| Artist of the Year 
| 
|-
| Favorite Female Artist 
|
|-
|Favourite Artist - Pop
|
|-
|Perro Fiel (featuring Nicky Jam)
|Favorite Song - Pop
|
|-
| rowspan="4" style="text-align:center"|2021
| rowspan="3" |Shakira
| Favorite Female Artist
|
|-
| Favorite Pop Artist
|
|-
| Social Artist of the Year
|
|-
| Me Gusta
| Favorite Pop Song
|
|-
| rowspan="5" style="text-align:center"|2023
| Shakira
| Favorite Pop Artist
|
|-
| rowspan="3" |Te Felicito (with Rauw Alejandro)
| Song of the Year
|
|-
| Collaboration of the Year
| 
|-
| Best Collaboration - Pop / Urban
| 
|-
| Monotonía (with Ozuna)
| Best Collaboration - Tropical
| 
|-

Latin Grammy Awards
The Latin Grammy Awards are awarded annually in the United States since 2000 for outstanding contributions to Spanish language music. Shakira has received eleven awards and one honorary award (scroll down below to the honors and accolades section) from twenty-seven nominations. Shakira was honored as the Latin Recording Academy Person of the Year on November 9, 2011, the day before the 12th Latin Grammy Awards.

Latino Music Awards

|-
| align="center"|2021
| Shakira
| Mejor artista pop femenina
| 
|-
| align="center"|2022
| Shakira
| Mejor artista pop femenina
| 
|-
|}

LOS40 Music Awards
LOS40 Music Awards (formerly titled 'Premios 40 Principales') is an awards ceremony hosted annually by the Spanish radio channel Los 40 Principales. Shakira has received ten awards from twenty-eight nominations.

|-
| rowspan="2" style="text-align:center"|2006
| Hips Don't Lie
| Best International Song
|
|-
|  Shakira
| Best International Artist
|
|-
| rowspan="1" style="text-align:center"|2007
| Las de la Intuición
| Best Latin Song
|
|-
| rowspan="2" style="text-align:center"|2009
|Loba
| Best International Song In Spanish Language
| 
|-
|  Shakira
| Best International Artist In Spanish Language
| 
|-
| rowspan="2" style="text-align:center"|2010
|Waka Waka (Esto es África)
| Best International Song In Spanish Language
| 
|-
| rowspan="3" style="text-align:left"|Shakira
| rowspan="2" style="text-align:left"|Best International Artist In Spanish Language
| 
|-
| rowspan="4" style="text-align:center"|2011
| 
|-
| rowspan="1" style="text-align:left"|Most influential Latin artist in the world
| 
|-
|Loca
| rowspan="2" style="text-align:left"|Best International Song In Spanish Language
| 
|-
|Rabiosa
| 
|-
| rowspan="1" style="text-align:center"|2012
| Shakira
| Best International Artist In Spanish Language
| 
|-
| rowspan="1" style="text-align:center"|2014
| Shakira
| Best Latin Artist
|
|-
| rowspan="3" style="text-align:center"|2016
| Shakira
| 50th Anniversary Golden Music Awards
|
|-
|  rowspan="2" |La Bicicleta (with Carlos Vives)
| 50th Anniversary Golden Music Awards
|
|-
| Los 40 Global Show Award
|
|-
| rowspan="3" style="text-align:center"|2017
| Shakira
| Best Latin Artist
|
|-
| Me Enamoré
| Los 40 Global Show Award
| 
|-
| Y, ¿Si Fuera Ella?
| Video of the Year
| 
|-
| rowspan="1" style="text-align:center"|2018
| El Dorado World Tour
| Tour of the Year
|
|-
| rowspan="6" style="text-align:center"|2022
| rowspan="2"|Don't You Worry (with Black Eyed Peas)
| Best Song - International
|
|-
|Best Collaboration - International
|
|-
|rowspan="3"|Te Felicito (with Rauw Alejandro)
|Best Song - Global Latin
|
|-
|Best Video - Global Latin
|
|-
|Best Collaboration - Global Latin
|
|-
|Shakira
|Best Act - Global Latin
|
|-
|}

LOS40 America Music Awards

|-
| rowspan="1" style="text-align:center"|2006
| Shakira
| Best Pop Act
|
|-
| rowspan="1" style="text-align:center"|2014
| Shakira (album)
| Mejor Álbum en Español
|
|-

Los Premios MTV Latinoamérica
Premios MTV Latinoamérica or VMALA's is the Latin American version of the Video Music Awards. Shakira has received twelve awards from nineteen nominations.

|-
| rowspan="5" style="text-align:center"|2002
| rowspan="4"|Shakira
| Artist of the Year
|
|-
| Best Female Artist
|
|-
| Best Pop Artist
|
|-
| Best Artist — North
|
|-
| rowspan="1" |"Suerte"
| Video of the Year
|
|-
|-
| rowspan="6" style="text-align:center"|2005
| rowspan="1" |"La tortura"
| Video of the Year
|
|-
| rowspan="1" |"No"
| Video of the Year
|
|-
| rowspan="4" |Shakira
| Artist of the Year
|
|-
| Best Female Artist
|
|-
| Best Pop Artist
|
|-
| Best Artist — Central
|
|-
| style="text-align:center"|2006
| "Hips Don't Lie"
| Song of the Year
|
|-
| style="text-align:center"|2007
| "Te Lo Agradezco, Pero No"
| Video of the Year
|
|-
| rowspan="6" style="text-align:center"|2009
| rowspan="3" |Shakira
| Fashionista Award — Female
|
|-
| Best Fan Club
|
|-
| Agent of Change
|
|-
| rowspan="2" |"Loba"
| Video of the Year
|
|-
| Song of the Year
|
|-
| Shakira — Loba
| Best Live Performance at "Los Premios 2009"
| 
|-

Lunas del Auditorio

MuchMusic Video Awards 
The MuchMusic Video Awards are annual awards presented by the Canadian music video channel MuchMusic to honour the year's best music videos. Shakira has received two awards from three nominations.

|-
| rowspan="2" style="text-align:center"|2002
| rowspan="2" |"Whenever, Wherever"
| People's Choice: Favourite International Artist
|
|-
| Best International Artist Video
|
|-
| style="text-align:center"|2007
| "Beautiful Liar" (with Beyoncé)
| Best International Video Artist
|
|-

MTV Awards

MTV Asia Awards 
The MTV Asia Awards gives recognition and awards to Asian and international icons in achievement, cinema, fashion, humanitarian, and music. Shakira has been nominated thrice.

|-
| rowspan="2" style="text-align:center"|2003
| rowspan="2"|Shakira
| Best Female Artist
|
|-
| Best New Artist
|
|-
| style="text-align:center"|2008
| "Beautiful Liar" (with Beyoncé)
| Best Hook Up
|
|-

MTV Europe Music Awards
The MTV Europe Music Awards were established in 1994 by MTV Networks Europe to celebrate the most popular music videos in Europe. Shakira has received two awards from eighteen nominations.

|-
| rowspan="4" style="text-align:center"|2002
| Whenever, Wherever
| Best Song
|
|-
| rowspan="7" |Shakira
| Best Female
|
|-
| Best New Act
|
|-
| rowspan="2" |Best Pop
|
|-
| rowspan="2" style="text-align:center"|2005
|
|-
| rowspan="2" |Best Female
|
|-
| rowspan="3" style="text-align:center"|2006
|
|-
| Best Pop
|
|-
| Hips Don't Lie
| Best Song
|
|-
| style="text-align:center"|2007
| Beautiful Liar (with Beyoncé)
| Most Addictive track
|
|-
| rowspan="2" style="text-align:center"|2009
| She Wolf
| Best Video
|
|-
| rowspan="4" |Shakira
| rowspan="2" |Best Female
|
|-
| rowspan="2" style="text-align:center"|2010
|
|-
| Free Your Mind
|
|-
| rowspan="2" style="text-align:center"|2021
| Best Latin
|
|-
| Girl Like Me (with Black Eyed Peas)
| Best Collaboration
|
|-
|rowspan="2"|2022
|rowspan="2"|Te Felicito (with Rauw Alejandro)
|Best Collaboration
|
|-
|Best Latin
|
|-

MTV MIAW Awards

|-
| rowspan="1"|2021
| "Girl Like Me" (with Black Eyed Peas)
| Global Collab
| 
|-
|}

MTV Video Music Awards Japan
The MTV Video Music Awards Japan are the Japanese version of the MTV Video Music Awards. Shakira has been nominated for twice.

|-
| rowspan="2" style="text-align:center"|2008
| rowspan="2"|Beautiful Liar (with Beyonce)
| Best Collaboration
|
|-
| Best Pop Video
|

MTV Millennial Awards
The MTV Millennial Awards celebrates music, movies, TV, fashion and things that happen on social media. Shakira has been nominated once.

|-
| rowspan="1" style="text-align:center"|2014
| rowspan="1"|Shakira
| Colombian Twitter Star Of The Year
|
|-
| rowspan="1" style="text-align:center" rowspan="2"|2017
| rowspan="1"|"Chantaje" feat Maluma
| Collaboration of the Year
|
|-
| rowspan="1"|La Bicicleta feat Carlos Vives
| Best Party Anthem
|
|-
| rowspan="1" style="text-align:center"|2018
| rowspan="1"|Shakira
| Artist of the Year (Colombia)
|
|-

MTV Italian Music Awards
Firstly called TRL Awards, since 2012 it is presented by MTV Italy changing the name in MTV Italian Music Awards.

|-
| rowspan="1" style="text-align:center"|2014
| rowspan="1"|Can't Remember To Forget You (ft. Rihanna)
| Best video
|

MTV Video Music Awards
The MTV Video Music Awards were established at the end of the summer of 1984 by MTV to celebrate the top music videos of the year. Shakira has received four awards from twenty-five nominations.

|-
| rowspan="2" style="text-align:center"|2000
| rowspan="2" |"Ojos Así"
| International Viewer's Choice — Latin America (North)
|
|-
| International Viewer's Choice — Latin America (South)
|
|-
| rowspan="7" style="text-align:center"|2002
| rowspan="7" |"Whenever, Wherever/Suerte"
| Best Female Video
|
|-
| Best Pop Video
|
|-
| Best Dance video
|
|-
| Best Cinematography in a Video
|
|-
| International Viewer's Choice — Latin America (North)
|
|-
| International Viewer's Choice — Latin America (Pacific)
|
|-
| International Viewer's Choice — Latin America (Atlantic)
|
|-
| rowspan="3" style="text-align:center"|2005
| rowspan="3" |"La tortura"
| Best Female Video
|
|-
| Viewer's Choice
|
|-
| Best Dance Video
|
|-
| rowspan="7" style="text-align:center"|2006
| rowspan="7" |"Hips Don't Lie"
| Best Female Video
|
|-
| Best Pop Video
|
|-
| Best Dance Video
|
|-
| Video of the Year
|
|-
| Viewer's Choice
|
|-
| Best Choreography in a Video
|
|-
| Best Art Direction in a Video
|
|-
| rowspan="4" style="text-align:center"|2007
| rowspan="4" |"Beautiful Liar" (with Beyoncé)
| Most Earthshattering Collaboration
|
|-
| Best Director
|
|-
| Best Choreography in a Video
|
|-
| Best Editing in a Video
|
|-
| style="text-align:center"|2010
| Shakira
| Latino Artist of the Year
|
|-
| style="text-align:center"|2018
| "Chantaje" (with Maluma)
| rowspan="2" | Best Latin
|
|-
| style="text-align:center"|2021
| "Girl Like Me" (with Black Eyed Peas)
|

Music Television Awards

Premios ACPE

|-
|rowspan="3"| 1996
|Shakira
|Intérprete del año
|
|-
|"Estoy Aquí"
|Video del año
|
|-
|"¿Dónde Estás Corazón?
|Canción del año
|
|-
|}

Premios Amigo
The Premios Amigo is a music award ceremony in Spain, presented annually by Productores de Música de España since 1997.

|-
| rowspan="1" style="text-align:center"|1999
| Shakira
| Mejor solista femenina latina
| 
|-
| rowspan="1" style="text-align:center"|2002
| Shakira
| Mejor solista femenina latina
|

Premios De La Musica

|-
| rowspan="1" style="text-align:center"|2006
| Shakira
| Premio Latino de Honor
| 
|-
|}

Premios Eres

|-
| style="text-align:center"|1996
| rowspan="4"| Shakira
| Mejor Cantante
| 
|-
| style="text-align:center"|1997
| Cantante Pop Del Año
| 
|-
| style="text-align:center"|1998
| Mejor Desempeño Pop Femenino
| 
|-
| style="text-align:center"|1999
| Mejor Cantante
| 
|-
|}

Premios Gardel

|-
| rowspan="2" style="text-align:center"|2000
| Shakira
| Mejor artista femenina
| 
|-
| Dónde Están los Ladrones?
| Album del año
| 
|-
| style="text-align:center"|2001
| Shakira
| Artista femenina latina
| 
|-
|}

Premios HTV

|-
|2005
|rowspan="3"|Shakira
|rowspan="2"|Artista más popular
|
|-
|rowspan="2"|2006
|
|-
|HTV de Oro
|
|-
|}

Premios Jovenes Líderes

|-
| style="text-align:center"|2010
| Shakira
| Joven Líder
| 
|-
|}

Premios Juventud
Premios Juventud is an awards show for Spanish-speaking celebrities in the areas of film, music, sports, fashion, and pop culture, presented by the television network Univision. Shakira has received fifteen award from forty nine nominations.

|-
| rowspan="6" style="text-align:center"|2004
| rowspan="5" |Shakira
| She's Totally Red Carpet
|
|-
| Dream Chic
|
|-
|Best Moves
|
|-
|All Over the Dial
|
|-
|My Idol Is
|
|-
|rowspan="1" |Shakira And Antonio De La Rúa
|Hottest Romance
|
|-
| rowspan="8" style="text-align:center"|2005
| rowspan="5" |Shakira
| Favourite Rock Star
|
|-
| Favourite Pop Star
|
|-
| My Idol Is..
|
|-
|Best Moves
|
|-
|I Hear Her Everywhere
|
|-
|rowspan="1" |Fijación Oral Vol. 1
|CD to Die For
|
|-
|rowspan="1" |"La Tortura"
|Catchiest Tune
|
|-
|rowspan="1" |Shakira and Alejandro Sanz
|Dynamic Duet
|
|-
| rowspan="3" style="text-align:center"|2006
| rowspan="3" |Shakira
| Favourite Rock artist
|
|-
| Favourite pop star
|
|-
|iQue rico se mueve!(Best moves)
|
|-
| rowspan="5" style="text-align:center"|2007
| rowspan="4" |Shakira
| Favourite pop star
|
|-
| My Favorite Concert
|
|-
|iQue rico se mueve!(Best moves)
|
|-
|My Idol is...
|
|-
| "Te Lo Agradezco, Pero No"
| The Perfect Combo
|
|-
| style="text-align:center"|2008
| Shakira
| iQue rico se mueve!(Best moves)
|
|-
| rowspan="5" style="text-align:center"|2010
| rowspan="2"|Shakira
| iQue rico se mueve!(Best moves)
|
|-
| Supernova Award
|
|-
|rowspan="2"|"Loba"
| My Favorite Video
|
|-
| My Ringtone
|
|-
| "Somos el Mundo"
| The Perfect Combo
|
|-
| rowspan="7" style="text-align:center"|2011
| rowspan="2"|Shakira
| iQue rico se mueve!(Best moves)
|
|-
| Favourite pop star
|
|-
|rowspan="3"|"Loca" (feat El Cata)
| Catchiest Tune
|
|-
| My Favorite Video
|
|-
| Favorite Ringtone
|
|-
| Sale El Sol
| Your Favorite CD
|
|-
| "The Sun Comes Out World Tour"
| The Super Tour
|
|-
| rowspan="2" style="text-align:center"|2012
| rowspan="2"|Shakira
| iQue rico se mueve!(Best moves)
|
|-
| Favourite pop star
|
|-
| rowspan="1" style="text-align:center"|2013
| rowspan="1"|Shakira
| iQue rico se mueve!(Best moves)
|
|-
|  rowspan="2" style="text-align:center"|2014
|  rowspan="1" |Shakira
|Favorite Hispanic Pop/Rock Artist
| 
|-
|  rowspan="1" |"Can't Remember to Forget You"
|Favorite hit
| 
|-
|  rowspan="2" style="text-align:center"|2015
|  rowspan="1" |"Mi Verdad"
|Perfect Combination
| 
|-
|  rowspan="1" |"Mi Verdad"
|Mi Letra Favorita
| 
|-
|  rowspan="2" style="text-align:center"|2016
|  rowspan="1" |"Mi Verdad"
|Mejor Tema Novelero
| 
|-
| rowspan="1" |Shakira
|Mi Tuitero Favorito
| 
|-
|  rowspan="4" style="text-align:center"|2017
|  rowspan="2" |"Chantaje" ft. Maluma
|Best Song For Dancing
| 
|-
| rowspan="2" |The Perfect Combination
| 
|-
| rowspan="2" |" La Bicicleta" ft. Carlos Vives
| 
|-
|Best Song For "Chillin"
| 
|-
|  rowspan="1" style="text-align:center"|2020
|  rowspan="1" |"Me Gusta"
|OMG Collaboration
| 
|-

Premios La Musa

|-
|2016
|Shakira
|Compositora
|
|-
|}

Premios Lo Nuestro
Premios Lo Nuestro is an awards show honoring the best of Latin music, presented by television network Univision. Shakira has received twenty-five awards from forty-eight nominations.

|-
| rowspan="5" style="text-align:center"|1997
| rowspan="2" |Shakira
| Best Pop Female Artist
|
|-
| Best New Artist
|
|-
| rowspan="1" |Pies Descalzos
| Pop Album of the Year
|
|-
| rowspan="1" |"Estoy Aquí"
| Pop Song of the Year
|
|-
| rowspan="1" |"Pies Descalzos, Sueños Blancos"
| Video of the Year
|
|-
| rowspan="4" style="text-align:center"|1999
| rowspan="1" |Shakira
| Best Pop Female Artist
|
|-
| rowspan="1" |Dónde Están los Ladrones?
| Pop Album of the Year 
|
|-
| rowspan="2" |"Ciega, Sordomuda"
| Pop Song of the Year
|
|-
| Video of the Year
|
|-
| style="text-align:center"|2000
| Shakira
| Best Pop Female Artist
|
|-
| rowspan="3" style="text-align:center"|2001
| MTV Unplugged
| Rock Album of the Year 
|
|-
|rowspan="2"| Shakira
| Best Rock Artist
|
|-
| Best Pop Female Artist
|
|-
| rowspan="1" style="text-align:center"|2002
| rowspan="1"|Laundry Service
| People Choice Award: Favorite Rock Album
|
|-
| rowspan="3" style="text-align:center"|2003
| rowspan="2"|Shakira
| Best Pop Female Artist
|
|-
| People'ｓ Internet Choice Award-Rock Genre
|
|-
| "Suerte"
| Song of the Year
|
|-
| rowspan="2" style="text-align:center"|2004
| Shakira
| Best Pop Female Artist
|
|-
| "Que Me Quedes Tu"
| Song of the Year
|
|-
| rowspan="4" style="text-align:center"|2006
| "La Tortura"
| Pop Song Of The Year
|
|-
| Shakira & Alejandro Sanz
| Group Or Duo Of The Year
|
|-
| Fijación Oral vol. 1
| Pop Album of the Year
|
|-
| "No"
| Clip of the Year
|
|-
| style="text-align:center"|2007
| Shakira
|Best Pop Female Artist
|
|-
| style="text-align:center"|2010
|"Loba"
| Video of the Year
| 
|-
|  rowspan="3" style="text-align:center"|2011
|  rowspan="2" |Shakira
| Artist of the Year
| 
|-
| Best Female Artist
| 
|-
|"Lo Hecho Está Hecho"
| Pop Song of the Year
| 
|-
|  rowspan="6" style="text-align:center"|2012
|  rowspan="2" |Shakira
| Artist of the Year
| 
|-
| Best Pop Female Artist
| 
|-
|  rowspan="2" |"Rabiosa"
| Pop Song of the Year
| 
|-
| Best Collaboration of the Year
| 
|-
|"Sale el Sol"
| Pop Song of the Year
| 
|-
|Sale el Sol
| Pop Album of the Year
| 
|-
| style="text-align:center"|2013
| Shakira
|Best Pop Female Artist
|
|-
|  rowspan="1" style="text-align:center"|2015
|  rowspan="2" |Shakira
|  rowspan="2" |Best Pop Female Artist
| 
|-
|  rowspan="4" style="text-align:center"|2016
| 
|-
| rowspan="3" |"Mi Verdad" 
| Collaboration of the Year
| 
|-
| Pop Song of the Year
| 
|-
| Video of the Year
| 
|-
| rowspan="3" style="text-align:center"|2017
| rowspan="3" |"La Bicicleta" 
| Single of the Year
| 
|-
| Video of the Year
| 
|-
|Tropical Song of the Year
|
|-
| rowspan="3" style="text-align:center"|2019 
| Shakira
| Pop/ Rock Artist of the Year 
| 
|-
| "Clandestino"  
|Pop/ Rock Collaboration of the Year
|
|-
| "El Dorado World Tour"
| Tour of the Year
| 
|-
| rowspan="2" style="text-align:center"|2021
|Shakira
|Pop Artist of the Year
|
|-
|Me Gusta
|Urban/Pop Song of the Year
|
|-
| style="text-align:center"|2022
|GIRL LIKE ME
|Collaboration Crossover Of The Year
|
|-
| rowspan="3" style="text-align:center"|2023
|Shakira
|Pop - Female Artist of the Year
|
|-
|rowspan="2"|Te Felicito (with Rauw Alejandro)
|Pop – Collaboration of the Year
|
|-
|Pop-Urban – Song of the Year
|
|-

Premios Nuestra Tierra
Premios Nuestra Tierra is an annual awards show honouring the creativity and drive of Colombian artists since 2007. Shakira has received eight awards from thirty-two nominations.

|-
| rowspan="6" style="text-align:center"|2007
| rowspan="3" |Shakira
| Best Pop Artist of the Year
|
|-
| Best Pop Performance of the Year
|
|-
| Best Artist of the Year
|
|-
| rowspan="1" |Hips Don't Lie
| Best Urban Performance of the Year
|
|-
| rowspan="1" |Fijación Oral, Vol. 1
| Best Album of the Year
|
|-
| rowspan="1" |"La Pared"
| Best Song of the Year
|
|-
| rowspan="1" style="text-align:center"|2008
| rowspan="1" |Hay Amores
| Best movie Soundtrack national
|
|-
| rowspan="5" style="text-align:center"|2010
| rowspan="3" |Shakira
| Best website Colombian artist
|
|-
| Best Artist of the Year (Public)
|
|-
| Best Pop Artist of the Year
|
|-
| rowspan="2" |Loba
| Best Pop Performance of the Year
|
|-
| Best Music Video of the Year (Colombian)
|
|-
| rowspan="9" style="text-align:center"|2011
| rowspan="2" |Waka Waka (This Time For Africa)
| Best Song of the Year
|
|-
| Best Song of the Year (Public)
|
|-
| rowspan="1" |Loca
| Best Music Video of the Year (Colombian)
|
|-
| rowspan="5" |Shakira
| Best Artist of the Year
|
|-
| Best Artist of the Year (Public)
|
|-
| Best Pop Artist of the Year
|
|-
| Twittered of the Year
|
|-
| Best Fan Club
|
|-
| rowspan="1" |Sale el Sol
| Album Of The Year 
|
|-
| rowspan="5" style="text-align:center"|2012
| rowspan="4" |Shakira
| Best Artist of the Year
|
|-
| Best Pop Artist of the Year
|
|-
| Best Artist of the Year (Public)
|
|-
| Twittered of the Year	
|
|-
|Antes de las Seis
| Best Pop Performance of the Year
|
|-
| rowspan="6" style="text-align:center"|2021
| rowspan="2" |Shakira
| Artista del Año
|
|-
| Artista Imagen de Nuestra Tierra en el Mundo
|
|-
| rowspan="3"|Girl Like Me (with Black Eyed Peas)
| Mejor Canción Dance Electro
|
|-
| Mejor Video
|
|-
| Canción Favorita del Público
|
|-
| Super Bowl LIV Halftime Show
| Mejor Presentación en Vivo, Virtual o en TV
|
|-
| rowspan="1" style="text-align:center"|2022
|Don't Wait Up
| Mejor Canción Dance/Electro
|
|-

Premios Oye!
Premios Oye! are presented annually by the Academia Nacional de la Música en México for outstanding achievements in Mexican record industry. Shakira has received nine awards from fifteen nominations.

|-
| rowspan="3" style="text-align:center"|2002
| rowspan="3"|Shakira
| Best International Female Artist
|
|-
| Best Pop Female Artist
|
|-
| Best Spanish Breakthrough of the Year
|
|-
| style="text-align:center"|2005
| Shakira
| Best Pop Female Artist
|
|-
| rowspan="5" style="text-align:center"|2006
| "Oral Fixation Vol. 2"
| Best English Record of the Year
|
|-
| "Día de Enero"
| Premio Social a la Música
|
|-
| rowspan="3"|"Hips Don't Lie"
| Best Spanish Song of the Year
|
|-
| Best English Song of the Year
|
|-
| Video of the Year
|
|-
| rowspan="2" style="text-align:center"|2007
| rowspan="2" |"Te Lo Agradezco, Pero No"
| Best Spanish Video of the Year
|
|-
| Best Spanish Song of the Year
|
|-
| rowspan="2" style="text-align:center"|2010
| rowspan="1" |She Wolf
| Spanish Album of the Year
|
|-
| Shakira
| Female Artist of the Year
|
|-
| rowspan="2" style="text-align:center"|2012
| rowspan="1" |Sale El Sol
| Spanish Album of the Year
|
|-
| Shakira
| Female Artist of the Year
|

Premios Ondas

|-
| style="text-align:center"|2002
| rowspan="3"|Shakira
| Mejor artista o grupo latino
| 
|-
| style="text-align:center"|2006
| Mejor artista o grupo internacional
| 
|-
| style="text-align:center"|2010
| Mejor artista o grupo latino/internacional
| 
|-
|}

Premios People en Español

|-
| rowspan="5" style="text-align:center"|2010
| She Wolf
| Álbum del año
| 
|-
| Waka Waka (This Time For Africa)
| Canción del Año
| 
|-
| Shakira
| Mejor Cantante o Grupo Pop
| 
|-
| "Lo Hecho Está Hecho"
| Vídeo del Año
| 
|-
| "Loba"
| El Regreso del Año
| 
|-
| rowspan="4" style="text-align:center"|2011
| Sale el Sol
| Mejor Álbum
| 
|-
| Rabiosa
| Canción del año
| 
|-
| Loca
| Mejor cóver
| 
|-
| Shakira y Gerard Piqué
| Pareja del año
| 
|-
|}

Premios Quiero

|-
|rowspan="2"|2009
|rowspan="2"|"Loba"
|Video artista femenina
|
|-
|Video del Año
|
|-
|rowspan="2"|2010
|rowspan="2"|"Loca" (with El Cata)
|Mejor vídeo pop
|
|-
|Mejor vídeo artista femenina
|
|-
|rowspan="2"|2011
|"Sale El Sol"
|Mejor vídeo artista femenina
|
|-
|"Rabiosa"(with El Cata)
|Mejor vídeo del año
|
|-
|2012
|"Addicted To You"
|Mejor vídeo artista femenina
|
|-
|rowspan="3"|2014
|rowspan="2"|"Nunca Me Acuerdo de Olvidarte"
|Mejor vídeo pop
|
|-
|Mejor vídeo artista femenina
|
|-
|"Dare (La La La)"
|Mejor coreografía
|
|-
|2015
|"Mi Verdad" (with Maná)
|Mejor encuentro extraordinario
|
|-
|rowspan="3"|2016
|rowspan="2"|La Bicicleta"(with Carlos Vives)
|Mejor vídeo pop
|
|-
|Mejor vídeo artista masculino
|
|-
|Shakira
|Mejor músico instagramer
|
|-
|2017
|"Me Enamoré"
|Mejor vídeo artista femenina
|
|-
|rowspan="2"|2018
|"Clandestino" (with Maluma)
|Mejor encuentro extraordinario
|
|-
|Shakira
|Mejor músico instagramer
|
|-
|rowspan="2"|2022
|rowspan="2"|Te Felicito (with Rauw Alejandro)
|Mejor Vídeo Pop
|
|-
|Vídeo del Año
|
|-
|}

Premios Shangay

|-
|rowspan="1"| 2010
|Shakira
|Mejor Artista Internacional
|
|-

Premios Soberano

|-
| style="text-align:center"|1997
| Shakira
| Mejor Cantante Latina
| 
|-
| style="text-align:center"|1998
| Shakira
| Soberano Internacional
| 
|-
| style="text-align:center"|1999
| Shakira
| Mejor Album
| 
|}

Premios Super Estrella de Oro

|-
| style="text-align:center"|1992
| Shakira
| Nuevo talento de la Música
| 
|-
|}

Premios Tu Mundo
Premios Tu Mundo is an awards show honoring the best of Latin music, presented by Telemundo. Shakira has been nominated three times.

|-
| rowspan="1" style="text-align:center"|2014
| rowspan="2" |Shakira
| rowspan="2" |Favorite Pop Artist 
|
|-
| rowspan="2" style="text-align:center"|2017 
|
|-
| rowspan="1" |Me Enamoré
| Party-Starter Song
|

Premios TV Guía

|-
| style="text-align:center"|1994
| Shakira
| La Mejor Cola de Colombia
| 
|-
|}

Prisma de Diamante

|-
| style="text-align:center"|1996
| Pies Descalzos
| Sales exceeding one million copies
| 
|-
|}

Radio Disney Music Awards
Radio Disney Music Awards is a Fan Voted. Shakira was honored with the Hero Award.

|-
| 2014
| Shakira
| Radio Disney Hero Award
|

Record of the Year Awards
The Record of the Year Awards was an award voted by the UK public. For many years it was given in conjunction with television programmes of the same name. Shakira three nomination.

|-
| rowspan="1" style="text-align:center"|2002
| Whenever Wherever 
| Record of the Year
|
|-
| rowspan="1" style="text-align:center"|2006
| Hips Don't Lie
| Record of the Year
| 
|-
| rowspan="1" style="text-align:center"|2007
| Beautiful Liar (with Beyonce)
| Record of the Year
|
|-

Ritmo Latino Music Awards
Ritmo Latino Music Awards was associated for four years bearing the name "El Premio De La Gente" and all the winners are determined in a direct vote by fans. Shakira has received three awards from three nominations.

|-
| rowspan="2" style="text-align:center"|1999
| ¿Dónde Están Los Ladrones?
| Best International Female Artist
|
|-
| Shakira
| Artist of the Year
|
|-
| rowspan="1" style="text-align:center"|2002
| "Suerte"
| Music Video of the Year
|

Shock Awards 
Shock Awards are held in Colombia.

|-
| rowspan="2" style="text-align:center"|1996
| Shakira
| Best Songwriter
|
|-
|Pies Descalzos
|Best Album
|
|-
| rowspan="4" style="text-align:center"|1999
| rowspan="3" |Shakira
| Person of the Year
|
|-
| Best Music Composer
|
|-
| Best Artist
|
|-
| Dónde Están los Ladrones?
| Best Album
|
|-
| rowspan="1" style="text-align:center"|2000
| "Hay amores"
| Best Soundtrack in a Film
|
|-
| rowspan="1" style="text-align:center"|2002
| Shakira
| Artist of the Year
|
|-
| rowspan="1" style="text-align:center"|2005
| Fijación Oral Vol. 1
| Best Album
|
|-
|  style="text-align:center"|2009
| "She Wolf"
| Best Radio Song
|
|-
| rowspan="2" style="text-align:center"|2010
| "Waka Waka (This Time for Africa)"
| Best Radio Song
|
|-
|She Wolf
|  Album of the Year
|
|-
| rowspan="1" style="text-align:center"|2016
| "La Bicicleta"
| Best Radio Song
|
|-

Swiss Music Awards
Swiss Music Awards are the annual awards of Switzerland, created in 2008. Shakira has been nominated once and won the award.

|-
| rowspan="1" style="text-align:center"|2011
| "Waka Waka (This Time for Africa)"
| Best International Hit
|
|-

TECLA Awards

|-
| style="text-align:center"|2017
| Shakira
| Telemundo Innovation Award
| 
|-
|}

Teen Choice Awards
The Teen Choice Awards were established in 1999 to honor the year's biggest achievements in music, movies, sports and television, being voted by young people aged between 13 and 19. Shakira has been nominated sixteen times winning two.

|-
| rowspan="3" style="text-align:center"|2002
| rowspan="1"|Shakira
| Choice Music: Female Artist
|
|-
|Whenever, Wherever
|rowspan="1"| Choice Single
|
|-
|Underneath Your Clothes
|rowspan="1"|Choice Love Song
|
|-
| rowspan="5" style="text-align:center"|2006
| rowspan="1"|Shakira
| Choice Music: Female Artist
|
|-
|Hips Don't Lie
|rowspan="1"|Choice Music: Single
|
|-
|Hips Don't Lie
|rowspan="1"|Choice Music: R&B/Hip-Hop Track
|
|-
|Hips Don't Lie
|rowspan="1"|Choice Summer Song
|
|-
| rowspan="1"|Shakira
| Choice V-Cast Artist
|
|-
| rowspan="2" style="text-align:center"|2010
| rowspan="2"|Shakira
| Choice Music: Female Artist
|
|-
| Choice Others: Activist
|
|-
| rowspan="1" style="text-align:center"|2014
| rowspan="1"|Shakira
| Choice TV Reality Personality - Female 
|
|-
| rowspan="1" style="text-align:center"|2015
| rowspan="1"|Shakira
| Choice Twit
|
|-
| rowspan="1" style="text-align:center"|2016
| rowspan="1"|Shakira
| Choice Song from a Movie or TV Show: "Try Everything"
|
|-
| rowspan="3" style="text-align:center"|2017
| rowspan="1"|Shakira
| Choice Latin Artist 
|
|-
|Chantaje ft. Maluma
|rowspan="2"|Choice Latin Song
|
|-
|Deja Vu ft. Prince Royce
|
|-
|}

Telehit Awards

|-
| rowspan="1" style="text-align:center"|2008
| rowspan="2"|Shakira
| rowspan="2"|Most Important Latin Artist in the World
|
|-
| rowspan="1" style="text-align:center"|2009
|
|-
| rowspan="1" style="text-align:center"|2011
| rowspan="1"|"Rabiosa"
| rowspan="1"|Song of the Year
|
|-
| rowspan="1" style="text-align:center"|2017
| rowspan="1"|Shakira
| rowspan="1"|Artist of the Decade
|
|-
|}

TMF Awards

|-
| style="text-align:center"|2002
| Shakira
| Beste nieuwkomer
| 
|-
|}

TRL Music Awards
TRL Awards (Italy) are the annual awards of Italy, to celebrate the most popular artists and music videos in Italy. Shakira has been nominated twice.

|-
| rowspan="2" style="text-align:center"|2011
| rowspan="2" | "Shakira"
| Too Much Award
|
|-
| Wonder Woman Award
|
|-

TVyNovelas Awards Colombia 

|-
|style="text-align:center"|1999
| Shakira
| Premio Especial A La Artista Del Siglo
| 
|-
|}

TVyNovelas Awards México

|-
| style="text-align:center"|2017
| Mi Verdad
| Best Musical Theme
| 
|-
|}

Urban Music Awards
The Urban Music Awards is a British awards ceremony for music launched in 2003. Shakira has been nominated once.

|-
|rowspan="1"| 2009 
| Shakira 
| Best Latino International Act 
|

VEVO Hot This Year Awards

|-
| rowspan="5" style="text-align:center"|2014
| La La La (Brazil 2014)
| Best Female Video
| 
|-
| La La La (Spanish)
| Best Latin Video
| 
|-
| rowspan="3"|Can't Remember to Forget You
| Best Certified Video
| 
|-
| Sexiest Video
| 
|-
| Best Collaboration Video
| 
|-
|}

VH1 Do Something Awards
VH1 Do Something Awards is an annual awards organised by DoSomething.org. Shakira has been nominated twice for her charity work, went to Haiti to start building a school, and recorded a charity single to benefit victims of Chile's earthquake.

|-
|rowspan="1"| 2010
| rowspan="2" |Shakira 
| rowspan="2" |DO SOMETHING Music Artist
| 
|-
|rowspan="1"| 2012
|

Victoria’s Secret What is Sexy Awards

|-
| style="text-align:center"|2013
| Shakira
| Sexiest curves
| 
|-
|}

Viña del Mar International Song Festival

|-
| style="text-align:center"|1993
| Shakira
| Mejor Intérprete
| 
|-
|}

Virgin Media Music Awards
The Virgin Media Music Awards are an annual music award presentation. The winners are declared on their official site "Virgin Media".
Shakira has received one award from one nomination.

|-
| style="text-align:center;" rowspan="1"|2011
| style="text-align:left;" rowspan="1"|Shakira
|Virgin Media Music Award for Best Female
|
|-
|}

World Music Awards
The World Music Awards is an international awards show founded in 1989 that annually honors recording artists based on worldwide sales figures provided by the International Federation of the Phonographic Industry (IFPI). Shakira has received seven awards from seventeen nominations.

|-
| rowspan="1" style="text-align:center"|1998
| rowspan="11" |Shakira
| rowspan="4" |World's Best Selling Latin Female Artist
|
|-
| rowspan="1" style="text-align:center"|2003
|
|-
| rowspan="1" style="text-align:center"|2005
|
|-
| rowspan="2" style="text-align:center"|2006
|
|-
| World's Best Selling Female Artist
|
|-
| style="text-align:center"|2007
| World's Best Selling Pop Artist
|
|-
| style="text-align:center"|2010
| World's Best Selling Latin American Artist
|
|-
| rowspan="10" style="text-align:center"|2014
| World's Best Female Artist
|
|-
| World's Best selling Latin Artist
|
|-
| World's Best Live Act
|
|-
| World's Best Entertainer of the Year
|
|-
|rowspan="2"|"Can't Remember to Forget You" (featuring Rihanna)
| World's Best Song 
|
|-
| World's Best Video
|
|-
|rowspan="2" |"Empire"
| World's Best Song
|
|-
| World's Best Video
|
|-
| Shakira
| rowspan="2" |World's Best Album
|
|-
| Live from Paris
|
|-

World Soundtrack Awards
The World Soundtrack Academy or World Soundtrack Awards, launched in 2001 by the Flanders International Film Festival, is aimed at organizing and overseeing the educational, cultural and professional aspects of the art of film music, including the preservation of the history of the soundtrack and its worldwide promotion. Shakira has been nominated once.

|-
| rowspan="1" style="text-align:center"|2008
| "Despedida"
| Best Original Song Written Directly for a Film
|
|-

Yahoo! Music Turning Purple Awards

|-
| rowspan="1" style="text-align:center"|2007
| "Beautiful Liar" (with Beyoncé)
| Turning Purple Award
|
|-

Yanofsky Awards

|-
|rowspan="3"| 2010
|Waka Waka (This Time for Africa)
|Canción del Año
|
|-
|rowspan="2"|Shakira
|Artista del Año
|
|-
|Mejor Artista Femenina
|
|-

You Choice Awards

|-
|rowspan="1"| 2010
|Waka Waka (This Time for Africa) (with Freshlyground)
|Best Collaboration
|
|-

Honours and Accolades
{| class="wikitable plainrowheaders sortable" style="margin-right: 0;"
|+ Name of country, year given, and name of honor (or honorary award)
|-
! scope="col" | Country or Organisation
! scope="col" | Year
! scope="col" | Honor (or honorary award)
! scope="col" class="unsortable" | 
|-
! Austria
| 2003
| Goldene Rathausmann (English: Golden man of the Vienna Town Hall)
| style="text-align:center;"| 
|-
! Argentina
| 2018
| Guest of Honor of Buenos Aires
| style="text-align:center;"| 
|-
! rowspan="5"|Colombia
| 1998
| El Orden Del Mérito (English: The Order of Merit)
| style="text-align:center;"| 
|-
| rowspan="2"| 1999
| La Gran Orden de la Democracia (English: The Grand Order of Democracy)
| style="text-align:center;"| 
|-
| La Medalla Pedro Romero - Hija Adoptiva de Cartagena (English: The Pedro Romero Medal - Adoptive Daughter of Cartagena)
| style="text-align:center;"| 
|-
| 2006
| Shakira's statue in Barranquilla
| style="text-align:center;"|  
|-
| 2014
| Mejor Líder de Colombia (English: The Best leader of Colombia)
| style="text-align:center;"| 
|-
! France
| 2011
| Ordre des Arts et des Lettres (English: Order of Arts and Letters)
| style="text-align:center;"|  
|-
! India
| 2013
| Order of Princess Isabella
| style="text-align:center;"| 
|-
! International Labour Organization
| 2010
| Social Justice Award
| style="text-align:center;"| 
|-
! NRJ Music Awards 
| 2011
| Honor for the Career
| style="text-align:center;"|
|-
! Lebanon
| 2018
| A square named after "Shakira Isabel Mebarak" in the Cedars reserve of Tannourine, and two cedar trees were planted in honor of her and her father.
| style="text-align:center;"| 
|-
! United Kingdom
| 2022
| The Ivors Academy (formerly the British Academy of Songwriters, Composers, and Authors) honoured Shakira with Ivor Novello Awards Special International Award with Apple Music for her success as one of the most influential songwriters and musical artists in the world. She is the second female artist to receive this honour, after Mariah Carey.
| style="text-align:center;"| 
|-
! rowspan="6"|United States
| rowspan="2"|2006
| Key to the city of Miami
| style="text-align:center;"| 
|-
| Shakira Day on December 6 (Miami, Florida)
| style="text-align:center;"| 
|-
| rowspan="2"|2011
| Latin Grammys Person of the Year
| style="text-align:center;"|
|-
| Star on Hollywood Walk of Fame (Recording Category)
| style="text-align:center;"|
|-
| 2016
| Inducted into Latin Songwriters Hall of Fame (Performer Category)
| style="text-align:center;"|
|-
| 2023
| The Grammy Museum honouring Shakira's creative legacy with an section in the museum named "Shakira, Shakira: The GRAMMY Museum Experience" 
| style="text-align:center;"| 
|-
! World Economic Forum
| 2017
| Crystal award winner
| style="text-align:center;"| 
|-
! World Literacy Foundation
| 2020
| Global Literacy Award
| style="text-align:center;"| 
|-

See also

References

 

|-

|-

External links
 Official Website

Awards
Shakira